Elmer A. Hyppa (February 7, 1919 – January 11, 2001) was an American politician from Buckley, Washington. He served in the Washington House of Representatives from 1953 to 1957. He was also the Sergeants at Arms of the House of Representatives from 1957 to 1967.

References

2001 deaths
1919 births
Democratic Party members of the Washington House of Representatives
20th-century American politicians
People from Buckley, Washington